Janine Elizabeth Beckie (born August 20, 1994) is a Canadian soccer player who plays as a forward for National Women's Soccer League club Portland Thorns FC and the Canada national team. She previously played for Sky Blue FC, the Houston Dash, and Manchester City. She is a dual citizen of Canada and the United States.

Early life
Born in Colorado to Canadian parents, Beckie attended Valor Christian High School in Highlands Ranch, Colorado. At Valor Christian, she played for the varsity team for four years and was named 2012 Gatorade Colorado Player of the Year.

Beckie attended Texas Tech University, where she played for the Red Raiders from 2012 to 2015 and became the all-time leading scorer for the women's team with 57 career goals. In December 2015, Beckie was named Player of the Year by Dallas Soccer News.

Club career

Early career 
In 2013, Beckie signed with the Seattle Sounders Women in the USL W-League.

Houston Dash
Beckie was selected eighth overall in the 2016 NWSL College Draft by the Houston Dash. On February 8, 2016, it was announced that Beckie would be allocated to the team as part of the NWSL Player Allocation On April 16, 2016, Beckie scored in her professional debut against the Chicago Red Stars

Sky Blue FC
On January 18, 2018, Beckie was traded to the Sky Blue FC along with Carli Lloyd by the Dash in a three-team trade with the Chicago Red Stars and Sky Blue FC. After making 15 appearances for Sky Blue, Beckie announced her departure from the club on August 9, 2018.

Manchester City W.F.C.
Beckie's transfer from Sky Blue FC to Manchester City was made official on August 9, 2018. Beckie concluded her first season with 8 goals in 15 games, and two trophies (FA League Cup, FA Cup). In the 2019–20 season, Beckie earned her first start in a UWCL game, and scored her first hat-trick in the competition.

On April 14, 2020, Beckie signed a new contract with Manchester City that would last until 2022.

Portland Thorns
In April 2022, it was announced that Beckie would return to the NWSL, signing a 3 year contract with Portland Thorns.

International career

Beckie has represented Canada on the under-20 and senior national teams. Beckie made her senior international debut on November 26, 2014, replacing Brittany Baxter at half time in a 1-1 draw against Sweden.

In August 2014, she scored the match-winning goal against North Korea to advance the under-20 team to the knockout stage of the FIFA U-20 Women's World Cup.

On February 19, 2023 Beckie made her 100th international appearance for Canada in a 2-0 win over Brazil.

2016 Summer Olympics 
Beckie scored three goals in the Rio 2016 Olympics –  helping the national team to defend their bronze medal effort in the 2012 London Olympics.

On May 25, 2019, she was named to the roster for the 2019 FIFA Women's World Cup.

2020 Summer Olympics 

On July 21, 2021, Beckie scored two goals in Canada's 2-1 defeat over Chile in the 2020 Summer Olympics group stage.

On August 6, 2021, Canada defeated Sweden 3–2 on penalty kicks to capture the gold medal in the 2020 Summer Olympics.

Personal life
Beckie is a Christian. Her brother Drew Beckie is also a soccer player for Atlético Ottawa. She is a co-owner of League1 Ontario club Simcoe County Rovers FC.

Career statistics

Club

International goals

Honours
Manchester City
FA Women's Super League runner-up: 2018–19
Women's FA Cup: 2018–19, 2019-20
FA Women's League Cup: 2018–19, 2021–22
Portland Thorns FC

 NWSL Championship: 2022

Canada
 Summer Olympics: gold medal 2021; bronze medal: 2016

Individual

 Canada Soccer Player of the Month: November 2020

References

External links 

 

Janine Beckie at Texas Tech Red Raiders

1994 births
Living people
People from Highlands Ranch, Colorado
Soccer players from Colorado
Citizens of Canada through descent
Soccer people from Saskatchewan
Canadian women's soccer players
Canada women's international soccer players
American women's soccer players
American emigrants to Canada
Women's association football forwards
Footballers at the 2015 Pan American Games
Texas Tech University alumni
Texas Tech Red Raiders women's soccer players
Canadian expatriate sportspeople in England
Canadian expatriate sportspeople in the United States
Expatriate women's footballers in England
Houston Dash players
National Women's Soccer League players
Footballers at the 2016 Summer Olympics
Olympic soccer players of Canada
Olympic bronze medalists for Canada
Olympic medalists in football
Medalists at the 2016 Summer Olympics
Houston Dash draft picks
NJ/NY Gotham FC players
2019 FIFA Women's World Cup players
Manchester City W.F.C. players
Pan American Games competitors for Canada
Footballers at the 2020 Summer Olympics
Medalists at the 2020 Summer Olympics
Olympic gold medalists for Canada
Simcoe County Rovers FC owners